The 1927 St. Ignatius Gray Fog football team was an American football team that represented St. Ignatius College (later renamed the University of San Francisco) as a member of the Far Western Conference (FWC) during the 1927 college football season. In its fourth season under head coach Jimmy Needles, the Gray Fog compiled a 3–5–1 record and was outscored by a total of 117 to 83.

Schedule

References

St. Ignatius
San Francisco Dons football seasons
St. Ignatius Gray Fog football